These are the official results of the men's individual time trial at the 2000 Summer Olympics in Sydney, Australia. The race was held on Saturday, September 30, 2000, with a race distance of 46.8 km.

On 17 January 2013, Lance Armstrong was stripped of the bronze medal and disqualified by the International Olympic Committee for an anti-doping rule violation. They also decided not to award Spanish cyclist Abraham Olano the medal, as he had also tested positive for doping, back in 1998.

Medalists

Final classification

References

External links
Official Report of the 2000 Sydney Summer Olympics available at  https://web.archive.org/web/20060622162855/http://www.la84foundation.org/5va/reports_frmst.htm

Men's road time trial
Cycling at the Summer Olympics – Men's individual time trial
Men's events at the 2000 Summer Olympics